River aux Vases may refer to:
 River aux Vases, Missouri, a community in Ste. Genevieve County, Missouri
 River aux Vases (stream), a creek in Ste. Genevieve County, Missouri